Buyant-Ukhaa International Airport, formerly called Chinggis Khaan International Airport from 2005 to 2020 , is a semi-operational international airport serving Ulaanbaatar, Mongolia, situated  southwest of the capital. Largely replaced by a new airport, it currently functions as a backup airport, with a view to be used for flight training as well as for special, charter, and government flights.

History

Development
The airport was first established as Buyant-Ukhaa Central Airport on 19 February 1957. In 1958, international flights began with flights to Irkutsk and Beijing using Ilyushin Il-14 aircraft. Regular flights from the airport started in 1961.

The terminal was upgraded to make it suitable for international traffic in 1986.

Following the Mongolian Revolution of 1990 and between 1994 and 1997 a further major upgrade of construction and air navigation was achieved with the assistance of the Asian Development Bank, making the airport compliant with ICAO standards. The US$50 million construction project was carried out by the successful bidder: a German / English joint venture of Philipp Holzmann and Wimpey Asphalt.

The airport was renamed after Chinggis Khaan (Genghis Khan) to Chinggis Khaan International Airport to celebrate the 800th anniversary of the establishment of a Mongolian State on 21 December 2005.

Replacement airport
The airport was replaced by the opening of the new Ulaanbaatar International Airport in 2021. Buyant-Ukhaa is somewhat restricted, the single runway is used in one direction for arriving aircraft and in the opposite direction for departures.

As the new airport is to be named Chinggis Khaan International Airport, Buyant-Ukhaa reverted to its former name on July 1, 2020.

Former airlines and destinations

Statistics

Traffic figures

Top destinations

Other facilities 
The airline Aero Mongolia has its head office on the third floor of the main airport building. The Air Accident Investigation Bureau Mongolia has its head office on the airport property. There is also one cargo hangar.

See also 
 List of airports in Mongolia
 List of airlines of Mongolia

Notes

References

External links 

 Official website
 Civil Aviation Authority of Mongolia
 Aeronautical Information Publication
 
 

Defunct airports
Airports in Mongolia
Airports established in 1961
Buildings and structures in Ulaanbaatar
1961 establishments in Mongolia
Transport in Ulaanbaatar